Yagit (International title: Pushcart of Dreams / ) is a Philippine television drama series broadcast by GMA Network. The series is based on a 1983 Philippine television drama series of the same title. Directed by Gina Alajar, it stars Chlaui Malayao, Zymic Jaranilla, Judie Dela Cruz and Jemwell Ventinilla. It premiered on October 13, 2014 on the network's Afternoon Prime line up replacing Dading. The series concluded on July 24, 2015 with a total of 203 episodes. It was replaced by Buena Familia in its timeslot.

Cast and characters

Lead cast
Chlaui Malayao as Eliza Guison / Chelsea Villaroman
Zymic Jaranilla as Ding Santos
Judie Dela Cruz as Jocelyn "Josie" Carpio Macabuhay
Jemwell Ventinilla as Tomas "Tom-Tom" Carpio Macabuhay

Supporting cast
Stephanie Yamut as Tiffany "Tiff" Montecillo 
Yasmien Kurdi as Dolores "Dolor" Macabuhay-Guison
LJ Reyes as Florentina "Flora" Fabro-Macabuhay 
James Blanco as Victor Guison Jr.
Renz Fernandez as Roman Guevarra
Bettina Carlos as Maricel "Izel" Ongkiko
Rich Asuncion as Odette Montecillo
Raquel Villavicencio as Claudia Guison
Kevin Santos as Kardo Macabuhay
Wowie de Guzman as Chito Asuncion
Ina Feleo as Imelda Macabuhay
Maricris Garcia as Cece Ortega

Recurring cast
Alessandra De Rossi as Marilou "Lulu" Villaroman / Anastacia Santos
Princess Punzalan as Mildred "Mili" Prado 
Paolo Contis as Rex Villamor / Restituto Santos
Jaya as Madam
Bea Binene as Jam
Kiko Estrada as Pipo
Boy 2 Quizon as Elmo

Guest cast
Shermaine Santiago as Ethel Santos
German Moreno as Florentino Valdez
Frank Magalona as Bruce Guison
Mark Herras as Rodney Estrella
Bobby Andrews as Ferdinand
Bryan Benedict as Andoy
Joseph Bitangcol as Tonyo
Hiro Peralta as Limuel
Chariz Solomon as Mabel
Leny Santos as Babylyn
Joseph Izon as Berting
Gene Padilla as Kulas
Rafa Siguion-Reyna as Baldo
Jirvy dela Cruz as Butch
Nomer Limatog as Jordan
Mitzi Borromeo as Elena
Dolly Gutierrez as Amparo
Dingdong Dantes as Jericho "Kokoy" Evangelista (a crossover character from Pari 'Koy)

Ratings
According to AGB Nielsen Philippines' Mega Manila household television ratings, the pilot episode of Yagit earned a 16.1% rating. While the final episode scored a 21.5% rating.

Accolades

References

External links
 
 

2014 Philippine television series debuts
2015 Philippine television series endings
Filipino-language television shows
GMA Network drama series
Television series reboots
Television shows set in Manila